The green-bellied tree skink (Epibator nigrofasciolatus) is a species of lizard in the family Scincidae. It is found in New Caledonia.

References

Epibator
Skinks of New Caledonia
Endemic fauna of New Caledonia
Reptiles described in 1869
Taxa named by Wilhelm Peters